Hopewell Historic District is a national historic district located in East Nottingham Township and Lower Oxford Township, Chester County, Pennsylvania. It encompasses 26 contributing buildings, 8 contributing sites, and 2 contributing structures in the former borough of Hopewell. It largely consists of a variety of stone and brick residences and outbuildings built between 1810 and 1914. They include examples of Georgian and vernacular styles. Notable properties include the Col. David Dickey House-Hopewell Academy (c. 1814), Samuel Dickey Farm, Schoolhouse / Lyceum Building (1888), Lower Mill (c. 1815), site of the Upper Mill, store / post office (c. 1810), five tenant houses, and three bridges.

It was added to the National Register of Historic Places in 1991.

References

Georgian architecture in Pennsylvania
Historic districts on the National Register of Historic Places in Pennsylvania
Historic districts in Chester County, Pennsylvania
National Register of Historic Places in Chester County, Pennsylvania